Silver Hawk is a 2004 Hong Kong superhero film directed by Jingle Ma and starring Michelle Yeoh, Richie Jen, Luke Goss, Brandon Chang, Adrian Cooper Lastra and Michael White. Yeoh plays the title character, a masked comic book style heroine who rides a motorcycle, saves kidnapped pandas and uses her martial arts moves on the bad guys. The masked heroine theme dates back to Huang Ying, a 1948 Shanghai book by Xiao Ping.

Plot
Silver Hawk is riding her motorcycle through China. She is chasing thugs who have stolen pandas and are getting away in a truck. She attaches her bike to the truck, jumps on top of and fights the men in the truck until they give up. She heads back to Polaris City (located where Hong Kong is in our world) where she meets an old childhood friend, Rich Man. Then a flashback occurs, going back to the martial arts training academy.
 
He is the new head of the police department. He recognizes Lulu, Silver Hawks's name in real life, from magazine covers. He tells her of his mission to arrest Silver Hawk. When they arrive at the airport, he asks for her phone number, but she asks for his phone instead. She implants a tracking chip so she can overhear his conversations and agrees to a date if he can recall who she is (there is an extended flashback to their childhood in a martial arts temple type setting), and puts the number of the police department into his phone as a joke.

At home, she is telling her assistant Mimi about her trip when her adoptive aunt arrives with Professor Ho Chung for a blind date. Prof. Ho starts to tell her of his new project when she gets word of a bank robbery. She suggests going to the movies and leaves. The pattern of fighting crooks and disappearing before the police arrive repeats until she arrives at a mugging. This is really a sting for Rich Man to arrest her, but she fends him off and handcuffs him to a pole. As she leaves, he yells that she's leaving without a goodbye. This triggers a flashback to when she left the academy with a monk who would train her further in kung fu, leaving him heartbroken.

In the next scene, Lulu enters her living room to find the professor's assistant waiting for her instead of the professor. The assistant, Kit, escorts her to the professor's demonstration of his project: an A.I. chip that would tap into several databases with information about the user to suggest ways for the user to improve his or her way of life. In a demonstration, the chip AI imprisons the volunteer and activates a hamster-wheel type structure to compel her to exercise.  Lulu doesn't like it because it might infringe on free will but the professor is insistent that his work is only to make life better for people. Later, Kit reveals he is a Silver Hawk fan and Man, who is there to provide security, confirms that Lulu his "little sister." Then the professor is kidnapped by Morris and Jane, with the police and Silver Hawk soon giving chase. At one point, the escape truck is blocked and the two kidnappers get out to slow the pursuit until the truck can move. Silver Hawk battles the two while a camera on his head sends images of her to his boss. The chase ends at an outdoor wedding where she chooses to save the bride instead of following the crooks.

While Man investigates Shiraishi Inc., who expressed interest in Ho's chip, Ho is brought before Alexander Wolfe, who wants his chip to take over the minds of the phone's users. He coerces Prof. Ho into helping him.

Man's investigation takes him to Zenda City (a.k.a. Tokyo), where Shiraishi is headquartered. His friend on the local force, Lt. Lisa Hayashi, takes him to the CEO, who is already seeing his niece, Lulu Wong. Later, the CEO's daughter Tina is kidnapped by Morris and Jane, and Lulu (not in costume) intervenes. The camera on Morris' head transmits images of Lulu to his boss (Wolfe), who deduces who Silver Hawk is by comparing her fighting style to Silverhawk's.  The crooks escape, and Man brings her to the local police station and asks her about her kung fu skills, which she had earlier denied maintaining.  Outside the station, they see the CEO driving away and follow him, knowing that he'd refused to cooperate with police. They tail him to a meeting with Wolfe, who whisks him away in a helicopter before the two can intervene. All Lulu can do is take a picture of Wolfe and later send it to Kit, knowing that he's a fan.

Wolfe wants the CEO to put Ho's chip in a new phone and distribute them in exchange for his daughter. Later, he forces Prof. Ho to speed up his preparation of the subliminal messages that phones will transmit, despite possible long-term damage to the user's mind. Ho manages to slip a secret message into the phone's computer code.

Days later, Shiraishi is promoting its new phone, and when Lulu approaches him about his daughter, he brusquely tells his staff to get rid of her. Lulu goes to her apartment and finds flowers and a message from Wolfe to meet him about Tina.  As she's about to leave, she finds Man, who has begun to guess who Silver Hawk is, waiting outside to talk to her. She tells him to wait in the hotel bar, but he leaves some tracking chips on top of the door.  When she leaves, the chips fall onto her hair, and he tracks her to her meeting. Inside the building, she meets Wolfe, who then sends four men attached to aerial stunt rigs to attack Silver Hawk. She manages to fend them off until Wolfe emerges and in a hand-to-hand fight, uses his bionic arms to injure her.  She spots a window and uses the bungee cords from one of the rigs leap up to a window and escape. Man tracks her to where, as Silverhawk, she has passed out from the pain.   He takes her to his apartment where she wakes up with her mask still on, although it's clear Man knows who she is. This is interrupted when Kit walks in and start to blab about the e-mail he'd sent her about Wolfe. Man drags him away to get the information about Wolfe.  That interrogation is interrupted by a newsflash about the CEO's support of Wolfe to run for premier. Kit sees how unnatural the CEO's face is; Man sees he's wearing a new phone. The two investigate the connection.

As Lulu bathes to heal her shoulder, she recalls a lesson her teacher gave her about the nature of water and kung fu. This gives her an idea on how to deal with Wolfe.

The next day, Kit has discovered the secret message Prof. Ho put in the code. Wolfe plans to activate the mind control in a few hours, but they don't know where to look for him until Silver Hawk sends them the address. There, the police battle Wolfe's thugs who this time are using roller-blades and metal hockey sticks to beat up the police and Kit.  Silver Hawk arrives to help put them away. Kit finds a way to Wolfe's lair and they rouse Prof. Ho to help them deactivate the mind control signal while Silver Hawk and Man battle Wolfe and his men.  She uses a new weapon reminiscent of a kyoketsu-shoge to subdue him.  With Wolfe defeated, the professor explains they need Wolfe's retinal scan to stop the upload, so Kit tricks him into opening his eyes as Man and Silver Hawk hold in him front of the scanner. This foils his plan but also activates the base's self-destruct system.  Many and the others escape, but Silver Hawk stays behind to help Wolfe escape (saying "It's Over...") but he turns on her and they have a final 1-on-1 battle, and Wolfe is crushed by the building.  Silver Hawk zooms off on her bike and launches missiles to blast through the barricade doors and escape.

Back in Polaris City, Lulu has a date with Man. He's called away on official business, leaving the question of whether he'd arrest Lulu unanswered. Cut to Silver Hawk on her motorcycle, presumably on route to the crime, and Man, who is now sporting his own motorcycle, drives up next to her, and the two tease each other about their signature moves, as they zoom off to fight crime.

Cast
 Michelle Yeoh as Lulu Wong / The Silver Hawk
 Richie Jen as Rich Man
 Luke Goss as Alexander Wolfe
 Brandon Chang as Kit
 Li Bingbing as Jane
 Michael Jai White as Morris

External links

2004 films
2004 science fiction action films
2004 martial arts films
2000s superhero films
Hong Kong science fiction action films
Hong Kong martial arts films
Hong Kong superhero films
Martial arts science fiction films
Police detective films
2000s Cantonese-language films
Media Asia films
Films directed by Jingle Ma
Films set in the future
Films with screenplays by Susan Chan
Superheroine films
2000s Hong Kong films